Yaji II was a Sultan of Kano who reigned from 1753 to 1768.

Biography in the Kano Chronicle
Below is a biography of Yaji II from Palmer's 1908 English translation of the Kano Chronicle.

References

Monarchs of Kano